Bouquet of Roses may refer to:
a bouquet of roses
Bouquet of Roses (album), an album by Les Paul and Mary Ford
"Bouquet of Roses" (song), a single by Eddy Arnold and his Tennessee Plow Boys
A Bouquet of Roses (painting), a painting by Pierre-Auguste Renoir